Felipe Reynoso Jiménez (January 2, 1919 – November 8, 2019) was a Mexican politician affiliated with the Institutional Revolutionary Party. He served as Municipal President of Aguascalientes from 1975 to 1977.

See also
 List of mayors of Aguascalientes

References

1919 births
2019 deaths
Politicians from Jalisco
Institutional Revolutionary Party politicians
Men centenarians
Mexican centenarians
20th-century Mexican politicians
Municipal presidents of Aguascalientes